Neil Bartram is a musical theatre composer/lyricist based in New York. Bartram is the composer and lyricist of Disney's Bedknobs and Broomsticks and Broadway's The Story of My Life with book writer Brian Hill.

Career
Prior to Broadway, The Story of My Life played at Canadian Stage Company in Toronto and Goodspeed's Norma Terris Theatre. Bartram has also written music and lyrics for Clara's Piano (Stratford Festival), Somewhere in the World (five seasons at the Charlottetown Festival) and The Nightingale and the Rose, and scored productions of Shakespeare In Love, Romeo and Juliet, Timon of Athens and A Midsummer Night's Dream. His adaptation of Carlo Collodi's The Adventures of Pinocchio was commissioned by Chicago Shakespeare Theater for their 2011 season. Bartram and Hill's musical Not Wanted On The Voyage received a developmental production at Northwestern University's Barber Theatre as part of the American Music Theatre Project and was part of Goodspeed Musicals' 2012 New Works Festival. His musical The Theory of Relativity, commissioned by Toronto's Sheridan College and written specifically for and about college age students, was part of Goodspeed's 2014 New Works Festival and had its London, UK premiere in May 2014.

Other projects include Spin directed by Eric Schaeffer (premiered at the Signature Theatre, Arlington, VA), an adaptation of Michel Tremblay's Les Belles-Soeurs, a musical based on Ray Bradbury's classic novel Something Wicked This Way Comes, and the stage adaptation of Disney's beloved film Bedknobs and Broomsticks, all with book writer Brian Hill.

Bartram's awards include a Jonathan Larson Foundation Award, a Dramatists Guild Fellowship, and a Dora Award. The Story of My Life received four Drama Desk Award nominations: outstanding book, outstanding music, outstanding lyrics and outstanding production of a musical.

Cast albums include Somewhere in the World, The Story of My Life and The Theory of Relativity (PS Classics). Bartram is a member of the Dramatists Guild, ASCAP, and is an alumnus of the BMI Lehman Engel Music Theatre Workshop.  His work is published by Warner / Chappell Music.

Works
The Story of My Life with Brian Hill, directed by Richard Maltby Jr., starring Will Chase and Malcolm Gets
The Adventures of Pinocchio with Hill, commissioned by Chicago Shakespeare Theater
Something Wicked This Way Comes with Hill
The Theory of Relativity with Hill, Goodspeed Musicals
Spin with Hill, Signature Theatre, directed by Eric Schaeffer.
You Are Here with Hill, Thousand Islands Playhouse, Goodspeed Musicals
Senza Luce with Hill, Sheridan College
Shakespeare In Love, new score for Chicago Shakespeare Theater, directed by Rachel Rockwell
Bedknobs and Broomsticks with Hill

References

External links
Official site: Bartram & Hill
Broadway-Aimed Musical Story of My Life, With Gets and Chase, Makes U.S. Premiere in CT

Year of birth missing (living people)
American musical theatre composers
American musical theatre lyricists
Canadian musical theatre composers
Canadian musical theatre lyricists
Living people
Place of birth missing (living people)